The 1953 Masters Tournament was the 17th Masters Tournament, held April 9–12 at Augusta National Golf Club in Augusta, Georgia.

Ben Hogan shattered the Masters scoring record by five strokes with a 274 (−14), which stood for twelve years, until Jack Nicklaus' 271 in 1965. Hogan shot four rounds of 70 or better, and went on to win the U.S. Open by six strokes in June and the British Open by four in July. Through 2022, it remains the only time these three majors were won in the same calendar year.

Hogan, age forty, led by four strokes after 54 holes and finished five ahead of runner-up Ed Oliver to win his second Masters, the seventh of his nine major titles. This win was commemorated five years later in 1958 with the dedication of the Hogan Bridge over Rae's Creek at the par-3 12th hole.

Hogan was the first Masters winner over age forty; a few months older than Hogan, Sam Snead won the next year at 41.

Course

Field
1. Masters champions
Jimmy Demaret (10), Claude Harmon (9), Ben Hogan (2,6,9,10), Byron Nelson (2,6,9), Henry Picard (6), Gene Sarazen (2,4,6), Horton Smith (10), Sam Snead (4,6,9,10), Craig Wood (2)
Ralph Guldahl (2) and Herman Keiser did not play.

2. U.S. Open champions
Julius Boros (9,10), Billy Burke, Olin Dutra (6), Chick Evans (3,a), Lloyd Mangrum (9,10), Fred McLeod, Cary Middlecoff (9,10,12), Sam Parks Jr., Lew Worsham (9,10)

3. U.S. Amateur champions
Dick Chapman (5,a), Charles Coe (a), Skee Riegel (9), Jess Sweetser (5,a), Jack Westland (11,a)

4. British Open champions
Jock Hutchison (6), Denny Shute (6)

5. British Amateur champions
Frank Stranahan (9,a), Robert Sweeny Jr. (a), Harvie Ward (9,a)

6. PGA champions
Jim Ferrier (9), Vic Ghezzi, Bob Hamilton (12), Chandler Harper, Johnny Revolta (9), Jim Turnesa (12)

7. Members of the U.S. 1953 Ryder Cup team
Team not selected in time for inclusion

8. Members of the U.S. 1953 Walker Cup team
Team not selected in time for inclusion

9. Top 24 players and ties from the 1952 Masters Tournament
Al Besselink, Arnold Blum (a), Tommy Bolt (10), Jack Burke Jr., George Fazio (10), Doug Ford (10), Fred Hawkins, Clayton Heafner, Joe Kirkwood Jr., Chuck Kocsis (a), Ted Kroll (10,12), Johnny Palmer

10. Top 24 players and ties from the 1952 U.S. Open
Al Brosch, Johnny Bulla, Clarence Doser (12), Leland Gibson, Chick Harbert (12), Jimmy Jackson (a), Milon Marusic, Dick Metz, Ed Oliver, Earl Stewart, Harry Todd, Felice Torza, Bill Trombley, Bo Wininger

Paul Runyan (6) did not play.

11. 1952 U.S. Amateur quarter-finalists
Don Cherry (a), Al Mengert

Gene Littler (a), Jim McHale Jr. (a) and Dick Yost (a) did not play.

12. 1952 PGA Championship quarter-finalists
Frank Champ, Fred Haas

13. One amateur, not already qualified, selected by a ballot of ex-U.S. Amateur champions
William C. Campbell (a)

14. One professional, not already qualified, selected by a ballot of ex-U.S. Open champions
Skip Alexander

15. Two players, not already qualified, with the best scoring average in the winter part of the 1953 PGA Tour
Jerry Barber, Dick Mayer

16. Foreign invitations
John de Bendern (5,a), Ricardo Rossi, Peter Thomson

Round summaries

First round
Thursday, April 9, 1953

Second round
Friday, April 10, 1953

Third round
Saturday, April 11, 1953

With a 66 (−6), 1951 champion Ben Hogan set the 54-hole scoring record at 205 (−11).

Final round
Sunday, April 12, 1953

Final leaderboard

Scorecard

Cumulative tournament scores, relative to par

References

External links
Masters.com – past winners and results
Augusta.com – 1953 Masters leaderboard and scorecards

1953
1953 in golf
1953 in American sports
1953 in sports in Georgia (U.S. state)
April 1953 sports events in the United States